Kildigulovo (Kildeğol) is a rural locality (a village) in Kipchaksky Selsoviet, Burzyansky District, Bashkortostan, Russia. The population was 428 as of 2010. There are 3 streets.

Geography 
Kildigulovo is located 54 km northeast of Starosubkhangulovo (the district's administrative centre) by road. Maly Kipchak is the nearest rural locality.

References 

Rural localities in Burzyansky District